On the Silver Globe is a 1988 Polish epic science fiction film directed and written by Andrzej Żuławski, adapted from The Lunar Trilogy by Jerzy Żuławski. Starring Andrzej Seweryn, Jerzy Trela, Iwona Bielska, Jan Frycz, Henryk Bista, Grażyna Deląg and Krystyna Janda, the plot follows a team of astronauts who land on an uninhabited planet and form a society. Many years later, a single astronaut is sent to the planet and becomes a messiah.

Production took place from 1976 to 1977, but was interrupted by the decision of the Polish authorities. After a few years, Żuławski was able to finish his film. On the Silver Globe premiered at the 1988 Cannes Film Festival. It has received critical acclaim.

Plot
In the far future, a group of dissident astronauts crash land on an unnamed Earth-like planet after escaping from a degraded and vaguely dystopian Earth. A man named Thomas succumbs to his injuries shortly after. As a result of the accident, only three astronauts remain, a woman named Marta and two men, Piotr and Jerzy. Communication with Earth is lost, the survivors decide to settle on the seashore and give rise to a new human race.

After the birth of their first son, Marta notices that the child is growing much faster than on Earth. Later, An unseen enemy kills Piotr and Marta dies in childbirth. A few decades later, when Jerzy is in his old age, the new humanity is a tribe of several dozen people with whom he can no longer make contact, they are partially feral and view Jerzy as a demigod. Before he dies, he sends a video diary to Earth containing recordings from handheld video cameras.

A planetary scientist named Marek receives the video diary and travels to the planet. When he arrives, the priests in power declare Marek to be the messiah, who, according to prophecy, must free humans from the power of telepathic bird-like humanoids called "Sherns", the planet's native inhabitants,. Marek accepts this role and leads a military campaign against the Sherns. Back on Earth, it's shown the reason Marek was sent to this planet in the first place was because his girlfriend, an actress, was sleeping with a fellow officer and they wanted to get rid of him to continue their affair. At first the humans succeed and capture the Shern leader Avius, but the subsequent landing in the Shern city ends in disaster. Meanwhile, the priests start to believe that Marek was an outcast from the Earth, rather than a messiah who came to fulfill the religious prophecy. Marek is stoned and then crucified.

Cast
 Andrzej Seweryn as Marek
 Jerzy Trela as Jerzy / The Old Man
 Grazyna Dyląg as Ihezal
 Waldemar Kownacki as Jacek
 Iwona Bielska as Marta
 Jerzy Gralek as Piotr
 Elzbieta Karkoszka as Ada, daughter of Marta
 Krystyna Janda as Aza
 Maciej Góraj as Jeret, a warrior
 Henryk Talar as Mark's guide
 Leszek Dlugosz as Tomasz
 Jan Frycz (credited as Andrzej Frycz) as Tomasz II, son of Marta and Tomasz
 Henryk Bista as High Priest Malahuda
 Wiesław Komasa as Actor
 Jerzy Goliński as astronaut
Andrzej Lubicz-Piotrowski as Awij

Production

Jerzy Żuławski wrote the novel on which the film is based, On the Silver Globe, around 1900 as part of The Lunar Trilogy. Żuławski was the granduncle of Andrzej Żuławski. Andrzej Żuławski left his native Poland for France in 1972 to avoid Polish communist government censorship. After Żuławski's critical success with the 1975 film L'important c'est d'aimer, the Polish authorities in charge of cultural affairs reevaluated their assessment of him. They invited him to return to Poland and produce a project of his own choice. Żuławski, who had always wanted to make a film of his grand uncle's novel, saw the offer as a unique opportunity to achieve this aim.

Between 1975 and 1977, Żuławski adapted the novel into a screenplay. He shot the film at various locations, including the Baltic seashore at Lisi Jar near Rozewie, Lower Silesia, the Wieliczka Salt Mine, the Tatra Mountains, the Caucasus mountains in Georgia, the Crimea in USSR, and the Gobi Desert in Mongolia. In the fall of 1977, the project came to a sudden halt when Janusz Wilhelmi was appointed vice-minister of cultural affairs. Wilhelmi shut down the film project, which was eighty percent complete, and ordered all materials destroyed.

The reels of the unfinished film were ultimately not destroyed, but preserved, along with costumes and props, by the film studio and by members of the cast and crew. Although Wilhelmi died a few months later in a plane crash, the film was only released after the end of communist rule. In May 1988, a version of the film, consisting of the preserved footage plus a commentary to fill in the narrative gaps, premiered at the 1988 Cannes Film Festival.

Reception

Accolades

References

External links

Na srebrnym globie on the Official Homepage of Andrzej Żuławski
Comprehensive website on On the Silver Globe 

1987 films
1980s science fiction drama films
Films directed by Andrzej Żuławski
1980s Polish-language films
Polish science fiction drama films
Films based on Polish novels
Films based on science fiction novels
Films shot in Mongolia
Films shot in Georgia (country)
Films set in the future
Films set on fictional planets
1970s unfinished films